The Estadio Centenario is a multi-purpose stadium built in 1988 in Armenia, Colombia. It is currently used mainly for football matches and is the home stadium of Deportes Quindío. The capacity is 20,716.

References

External links 
 Link to fussballtempel.net (multilingual)

Buildings and structures completed in 1988
Centenario
Copa América stadiums
Multi-purpose stadiums in Colombia
Armenia, Colombia
Buildings and structures in Quindío Department